{{Automatic taxobox
|image = Allagoptera arenaria.jpg
|image_caption = Allagoptera arenaria
|taxon = Allagoptera
|authority = Nees<ref name=whiffle>C.D.G. Nees in Wied-Neuwied, Reis nach Brasilien 2:335. 1821. Type:A. pumila (=A. arenaria (Gomes))Diplothemium Martius, Palmarum Familia 20. 1824.</ref>
|subdivision_ranks = Species
|subdivision = *Allagoptera arenariaAllagoptera brevicalyxAllagoptera campestrisAllagoptera caudescensAllagoptera leucocalyx|synonyms_ref = 
|synonyms = 
|type_species = Allagoptera arenaria}}Allagoptera is a monoecious genus of flowering plant in the palm family found in South America consisting of 5 accepted species.  Compared to other genera within the Cocoseae Allagoptera is described as particularly specialized. The genus name is a Greek combination of "change" and "feather", describing the full leaf; it was formerly named Diplothemium.

DescriptionAllagoptera produces very short or acaulescent trunks and in cases where the trunk grows erect it often makes a downward turn leaving the crown below the trunk-base.  The trunks in Allagoptera are among the few in the palm family which tend to bifurcate, producing multiple heads per unit. The pinnate leaves are gently arching to 2 m and are carried on long, slender petioles which are adaxially channeled.  The single-fold leaflets are regularly or irregularly arranged on the rachis each protruding into a different plane, creating a plumose leaf.  The unusual spicate inflorescence emerges from within the leaf-crown carrying the pistilate flowers basally with the staminate flowers growing distally.  The single-seeded fruit is yellow to brown, growing in crowded clusters.
Species

Distribution and habitat
Palms in this genus are found in Brazil, Paraguay, Bolivia, and Argentina growing in a variety of habitats.  Some thrive in sandy beaches and dunes, while others are found in woodlands; Allagoptera'' species are also common along sandstone hills and in the Cerrado vegetation.

References

External links

Allagoptera on NPGS/GRIN
Fairchild Guide to Palms

Cocoseae
Flora of Brazil
Flora of Argentina
Flora of Uruguay
Flora of Paraguay
Arecaceae genera